Chelidonura pallida is a species of sea slug, or "headshield slug", a marine opisthobranch gastropod mollusk in the family Aglajidae.

References

External links

 Chelidonura pallida at SeaSlug Forum

Aglajidae
Gastropods described in 1951